William Brooks Johnson (1763–1830) (also Brookes) was an English physician and botanist.

Life
He was educated at Repton School and admitted to Christ's College, Cambridge in 1783, graduating M.B. in 1789. He became a medical practitioner with a particular interest in botanical chemistry. He associated with Jonathan Stokes and Smithson Tennant.

In 1791 Johnson joined the Derby Constitutional Society. With Henry Redhead Yorke, he wrote the French Revolution-inspired "Derby Address". They took it to Paris, to present to the Constitutional Convention. In 1791 Johnson joined the Derby Constitutional Society. With Henry Redhead Yorke, he wrote the French Revolution-inspired "Derby Address". They took it to Paris, to present to the National Convention. Johnson in 1792 lodged with Tom Paine in the Faubourg Saint-Denis. Both Johnson and Yorke associated with the "British Club" of ex-patriate supporters of the Revolution. They broke with it, however, in 1793, over a resolution of the Club in favour of a French invasion of Great Britain. Yorke left, accused of spying for the British.

Works
Johnson was author of History of the Progress and Present State of Animal Chemistry published in three volumes in 1803. It had an extended review in The Monthly Review for October 1805, which concluded that it was "a laborious collection of facts". From the point of view of clinical chemistry, somewhat neglected at the end of the 18th century, Rosenfeld regards Johnson's work as attempting "to present the subject on a larger scale and with a more connected and systematic arrangement."

Notes

People from Holbrook, Derbyshire
Johnson, William Brooks
1763 births
1830 deaths
18th-century English medical doctors
18th-century British botanists
19th-century English medical doctors
19th-century British botanists